Charlotte Aïssé (a corruption of Haïdé;  – 13 March 1733), French letter-writer, was the daughter of a Circassian chief, and was born about 1694.

Life

Her father's palace was pillaged by the Turks, and as a child of four years old she was sold to the comte Charles de Ferriol, the French ambassador at Constantinople. She was brought up in Paris by Ferriol's sister-in-law, Marie-Angélique de Tencin, with her own sons,  (1697–1774) and d'Argental (1700–1788). Her great beauty and romantic history made her the fashion, and she attracted the notice of the regent, Philip II, Duke of Orléans, whose offers she had the strength of mind to refuse. She formed a deep and lasting attachment to Blaise-Marie d'Aydie (1692–1761), a knight of Malta, by whom she had a daughter. She died in Paris.

Lettres de Mademoiselle Aïssé à Madame C…

Her letters to her friend Julie Calandrini (1668–1754), were first published with notes attributed to Voltaire (1787). They were republished the following year and throughout the 19th century. Their recipient was not correctly identified until the 1806 edition.

Letter VII, dated Paris, 1727, was adapted by Leonora Blanche Alleyne as The Man in White and illustrated by Henry Justice Ford in The Red True Story Book (1895).

It has been argued that the letters were heavily rewritten before their posthumous publication, based on stylistic differences with rare surviving manuscripts.

Mlle Aïssé in fiction
Mlle Aïssé may have inspired Abbé Prévost's  (1740) and Claire de Duras's Ourika (1823).

She has been the subject of three plays: 
 1871: Mademoiselle Aïssé, a play in 4 acts, in verse, by Louis Bouilhet, in which her character was played by Sarah Bernhardt 
 1898: Aïssé, comedy in 5 acts, in verse, by  under the pen name François Dejoux

She was also the inspiration for Rosa Campbell Praed's historical novel, The Romance of Mademoiselle Aïssé (1910).

Bibliography
 Amelia Gere Mason, The Women of the French Salons (1891), ch.11. 
 Edmund Gosse, French Profiles (1905), p.35-67.
 Evangeline Wilbour Blashfield, Portraits and Backgrounds: Hrotsvitha, Aphra Behn, Aïssé, Rosalba Carriera (1917).
 J. Christopher Herold, Love in five temperaments (1961).
 Amy J. Ransom, ″Mademoiselle Aïssé: inspiration for Claire de Duras's Ourika?″, Romance Quarterly 46:2 (1999), p.84-98.
 Valerie Lastinger, ″Charlotte Elisabeth Aïssé″, in Writings by pre-revolutionary French women, ed. Anne R. Larsen and Colette H. Winn (1999) vol.2, p.543–58.

References

External links
 
 
 

1694 births
1733 deaths
French essayists
French letter writers
Women letter writers
18th-century French writers
18th-century French women writers
French slaves
People from the Ottoman Empire of Circassian descent
French women essayists
18th-century essayists
Emigrants from the Ottoman Empire to France
18th-century slaves
Slaves from the Ottoman Empire
18th-century letter writers